Babylonia lutosa is a species of sea snail, a marine gastropod mollusk, in the family Babyloniidae.

References

lutosa
Gastropods described in 1816